Bustimes.org is a transportation information website created to take advantage of Bus Services Act 2017 requirements for bus operators by the Department for Transport that bus timetables, fares and vehicle locations could be provided in an open data format, which can be utilised by app and website developers. This DfT service is called the Bus Open Data Service.

Location data from operators such as Lothian Buses is supplied to the site via the Transport for Edinburgh Open Data system.

The site uses data from AVL tracking to determine and transmit the geographic location of a vehicle, such as data from Ticketer machines and the iBus system in order to display live bus positions on a map.

The site also uses data from the National Public Transport Gazetteer, and bus stop locations from NaPTAN.

The live tracking system was added in response to the Department for Transport stating that they wanted "to see more people taking the bus, and...those who do take it to have the best possible experience." with fares for companies operating the Passenger MyTrip system being added in 2022.

Criticism

The website was criticised by Centrebus Group owner, Julian Peddle, as lacking authority, not being an "official website" and questioning if trust can be placed in its information in an article in Buses Magazine about bus timetable information.

References

External links
Bustimes.org

Bus transport in England
Travel technology
Open data
Public transport in the United Kingdom